The 1984 WCHA Men's Ice Hockey Tournament was the 25th conference playoff in league history and 32nd season where a WCHA champion was crowned. The tournament was played between February 25 and March 11, 1984. First round and semifinal games were played at home team campus sites while the championship match was held at the Williams Arena in Minneapolis, Minnesota. By winning the tournament, Minnesota-Duluth received the WCHA's automatic bid to the 1984 NCAA Division I Men's Ice Hockey Tournament.

Format
All member teams were eligible for the tournament and were seeded No. 1 through No. 6 according to their final conference standing, with a tiebreaker system used to seed teams with an identical number of points accumulated. Unlike previous years the Broadmoor Trophy recipient's (Minnesota-Duluth) home venue was not used for the tournament championship round. Instead the Williams Arena, the home of the Minnesota Golden Gophers, served as the site for the Championship game. Each series were two-game matchups with the team that scored the most goals advancing to the succeeding round. The top two seeded teams received byes into the semifinal round while the third seed and sixth seed and the fourth seed and fifth seed met in the first round. The teams that advanced to the semifinal were re-seeded according to the final regular season conference standings, with the first seed matched against lowest remaining seed in one semifinal game and the second seed meeting with the other advancing team with the winners meeting in the championship round. The Tournament Champion received an automatic bid to the 1984 NCAA Division I Men's Ice Hockey Tournament.

Conference standings
Note: GP = Games played; W = Wins; L = Losses; T = Ties; PTS = Points; GF = Goals For; GA = Goals Against

Bracket

Teams are reseeded after the first round

Note: * denotes overtime period(s)

First round

(3) Minnesota vs. (6) Colorado College

(4) Wisconsin vs. (5) Denver

Semifinals

(1) Minnesota-Duluth vs. (4) Wisconsin

(2) North Dakota vs. (3) Minnesota

Championship

(1) Minnesota-Duluth vs. (2) North Dakota

Tournament awards
None

See also
Western Collegiate Hockey Association men's champions

References

External links
WCHA.com
1983–84 WCHA Standings
1983–84 NCAA Standings
2013–14 Colorado College Tigers Media Guide
2013–14 Denver Pioneers Media Guide
2013–14 Minnesota Golden Gophers Media Guide 
2012–13 Minnesota-Duluth Bulldogs Media Guide
2013–14 North Dakota Hockey Media Guide
2003–04 Wisconsin Badgers Media Guide

WCHA Men's Ice Hockey Tournament
Wcha Men's Ice Hockey Tournament